Paramartyria anmashana is a species of moth belonging to the family Micropterigidae. It was described in 2000 and is only known from Taiwan.

Adults have been found perching on leaves of ferns and herbs in coniferous woods during daytime.

References

Micropterigidae
Moths of Taiwan
Endemic fauna of Taiwan
Moths described in 2000